El día después is a Spanish football show shown on #0 and formerly on Canal+. The show celebrates the "culture, passion and madness of Spanish football".

It is currently hosted by former Valencia goalkeeper Santiago Cañizares and the journalist José Antonio Ponseti.

Presenters
 Ignacio Lewin (1990—1994)
 Michael Robinson (1991—2005) 
 Francisco José "Lobo" Carrasco (1994—1997)
 Josep Pedrerol (1997—2004)
 Santiago Cañizares (2009— )
 Juan Manuel "Juanma" Castaño (2009—2011)
 José Antonio Ponseti (2011—)

References

External links
El día después at plus.es

Spanish comedy television series
Cero (TV channel) original programming